The History Channel: Civil War – A Nation Divided is a historical first-person shooter video game developed by Cauldron HQ, released on November 7, 2006 by Activision Value and the History Channel for Microsoft Windows, PlayStation 2 and Xbox 360. It garnered mostly mixed reviews.

Overview
The story line for A Nation Divided is relatively short, spanning twelve levels based on some of the most well known battles of the American Civil War. One can play as either a Confederate Soldier or a Union Soldier. The player plays as a different soldier during each battle.

Battles
During the game, the player can play through a total of twelve different battles from the Civil War.  The battles are divided into two campaigns: North and South.  Each campaign contains six historic battles.  The player must play through each battle to unlock the next one. After the first five battles are completed for each side, Cold Harbor is unlocked. Upon this battle's completion, Petersburg is unlocked.

Union                                  
 Fredericksburg (Pvt. Jeremy Burnet)
 Gettysburg (Pvt. Ellis Spear)
 Chattanooga (Pvt. Colin Geary)
 Fort Fisher (Pvt. Jim O'Neal)
 Selma (Pvt. John Howard)
 Petersburg (Pvt. Frank Adams)

Confederate
 Bull Run (Manassas) (Pvt. James G. Hudson) 
 Shiloh (Pvt. Rufus T. Neale)
 Antietam (Sharpsburg) (Pvt. William R. Mervine)
 Chancellorsville (Pvt. Ralph Stockton)
 Chickamauga (Pvt. James T. Lockhart)
 Cold Harbor (Pvt. Mosley Stokes)

Gameplay
Weapons of the war are portrayed accurately and have corresponding reloading processes. For example, the rifled musket reloading process is lengthy, while the revolver's is quick. The game fails to separate the two factions and has one rifled musket, the Springfield. While the Confederates used them as field pickups they primarily used the Pattern 1853 Enfield.

Melee combat is also a large part of the game, just as it was during the war. The Bowie knife and the cavalry saber are some of the melee weapons.

Each battle can be played on one of three difficulty modes: Easy, Normal and Hard. Completing the game on any mode unlocks an achievement.

No multiplayer features are present in the title, but the Xbox 360 version does support Leaderboards on Xbox Live. While the game specifications do include Downloadable Content, no content was released.

Reception

Upon its release, Civil War received mixed reviews with the main criticisms being stale gameplay, average graphics, low difficulty, poor AI, and the short length of the game, also, many people complained about various historical mistakes, or even lack of important details (like incorrect uniforms, lack of various infantries and regiments which is especially noticeable during the Bull Run level). However, many critics were pleased by the unique setting and fresh gameplay .

Sequel
In 2008, a sequel titled History Civil War: Secret Missions was released.

References

External links
Official Civil War: A Nation Divided website at Cauldron
Official Civil War: A Nation Divided website at Activision Value

2006 video games
Activision games
American Civil War video games
Video games developed in Slovakia
First-person shooters
North America-exclusive video games
PlayStation 2 games
Video games set in the United States
Windows games
Xbox 360 games